Helochelys is an extinct genus of stem turtle known from the Late Cretaceous (Cenomanian) of southern Germany.

References

Fossil taxa described in 1854
Early Cretaceous turtles
Extinct turtles
Testudinata